Desde el Fin del Mundo is the second studio album by Argentine rapper and singer Duki. It was released on 22 April 2021 through SSJ Records and Dale Play Records. Unlike their debut studio album Súper Sangre Joven, this album features 18 songs and features more guest producers and artists. The album features the participation of the artists Ysy A, Rei, Lucho SSJ, Farina, Lara91k, Asan, Bizarrap, Pablo Chill-E, Julianno Sosa, Young Cister, Neo Pistea, Obie Wanshot, Tobi, Khea, Pekeño 77, Mesita, Franux BB, 44 Kid and Ca7riel. The album despite having several renowned producers, was produced entirely by Yesan and Asan.

Background and composition
Desde el Fin del Mundo began its recording in mid-2020 ending at the beginning of 2021. The lyrics of the songs on the album talk about the achievements obtained by Duki in his short career, Duki talks in his songs about how he became the boy who rapped in the "Qunto Escalón" to be the maximum exponent of trap in Argentina, some songs also speak of love, lack of love, partys and drugs.

Promotion and singles
The promotion of Desde el Fin del Mundo began at the end of 2020, Duki via Instagram commented that he was not going to release songs until January 2021 to start the era of his second studio album, this came after he released an EP titled 24. Duki said the reason he didn't release songs until 2021 is so he can focus on recording the album.

On January 28, 2021 the first single "Muero de Fiesta este Finde" was released together with the Argentine singer Ca7riel, the song is the typical trap that Duki usually does combining rock sounds. The second single to be released was "Chico Estrella", the song was a trend in several countries and managed to reach #31 on the Billboard Argentina Hot 100 chart, the song talks about what Duki's life is like today, a rockstar life.

Track listing

Personnel
Personnel adapted from Tidal.

Primary Artist
 Duki – lead vocals, songwriting

Additional musicians
 Ysy A – vocals 
 Rei – vocals 
 Lucho SSJ – vocals 
 Farina – vocals 
 Lara91k – vocals 
 Asan – vocals 
 Pablo Chill-E – vocals 
 Julianno Sosa – vocals 
 Young Cister – vocals 
 Neo Pistea – vocals 
 Obie Wanshot – vocals 
 Tobi – vocals 
 Khea – vocals 
 Pekeño 77 – vocals 
 Mesita – vocals 
 Franux BB – vocals 
 44 Kid – vocals 
 Ca7riel – vocals 

Additional personnel
 Yesan – producer
 Asan – producer
 Marlku – producer 
 Club Hats – producer 
 Orodembow – producer 
 Zecca – producer 
 Evar – producer 
 Bizarrap – producer 
 Hide Miyabi – producer 
 Rulits – producer 
 Smash David – producer 
 Nahuel Lombardo – executive producer
 Candela Lombardo – assistant producer
 Ivo Woscoboinik – assistant producer
 Joaquín Crededio – recording
 Ramiro Colomer – recording
 Martin Algieri – recording
 Juan Pablo Morando – mixing
 Jonathan Vainberg – mixing
 Ezequiel Kronenberg – mixing
 Brian Taylor – mixing
 Javier Fracchia – mastering
 Francisco Alduncin – drums 
 Percii – guitar 
 Matias Lourenco – quena 
 Facundo Alama – coordinating producer
 Tito Leconte – coordinating producer

Charts

Certifications

Release history

References

2021 albums
Duki (rapper) albums